"The Voice" is a song by American rapper Lil Durk. It was released as the lead single from his sixth studio album of the same name on September 4, 2020. The song was produced by Turn Me Up Josh, LowLowTurnMeUp, Ayo Bleu, and :jp:Trill Dynasty.

Background and composition
On August 28, 2020, Lil Durk announced the song's release date. 

Instruments in the production of the song include piano, "sleek drum programming", electric guitar riff and organ. Durk melodically recounts his rough times in the past, such as his old life in the streets and living in quarantine. He also states his confidence in the rap game, calling himself "Chicago Jay-Z".

Charts

Certifications

References

2020 singles
2020 songs
Lil Durk songs
Songs written by Lil Durk